Never Die Young is a 2013 Luxembourgian drama film directed by Pol Cruchten. It was nominated as the Luxembourgian entry for the Best Foreign Language Film at the 87th Academy Awards.

See also
 List of submissions to the 87th Academy Awards for Best Foreign Language Film
 List of Luxembourgish submissions for the Academy Award for Best Foreign Language Film

References

External links
 

2013 films
2013 drama films
Luxembourgian drama films
2010s French-language films
Films directed by Pol Cruchten
French-language Luxembourgian films